

468001–468100 

|-bgcolor=#f2f2f2
| colspan=4 align=center | 
|}

468101–468200 

|-bgcolor=#f2f2f2
| colspan=4 align=center | 
|}

468201–468300 

|-bgcolor=#f2f2f2
| colspan=4 align=center | 
|}

468301–468400 

|-bgcolor=#f2f2f2
| colspan=4 align=center | 
|}

468401–468500 

|-bgcolor=#f2f2f2
| colspan=4 align=center | 
|}

468501–468600 

|-bgcolor=#f2f2f2
| colspan=4 align=center | 
|}

468601–468700 

|-bgcolor=#f2f2f2
| colspan=4 align=center | 
|}

468701–468800 

|-id=725
| 468725 Khalat ||  || Isaak Markovich Khalatnikov (nicknamed Khalat; born 1919) is an Academician of the Russian Academy of Sciences, and a theoretical physicist with an extremely wide range of scientific interests. He made important contributions to the theories of viscosity of superfluid helium, quantum electrodynamics and cosmology. || 
|}

468801–468900 

|-bgcolor=#f2f2f2
| colspan=4 align=center | 
|}

468901–469000 

|-bgcolor=#f2f2f2
| colspan=4 align=center | 
|}

References 

468001-469000